The Yorkshire Naturalists' Union is an association of amateur and professional naturalists covering a wide range of aspects of natural history. It is one of United Kingdom's oldest extant wildlife organisations and oldest natural history federation. Its Mycological Committee, founded in 1892, is the oldest permanent organisation dedicated to the study of fungi in Great Britain.

History
The Yorkshire Naturalists' Union was founded in 1861 as the West Riding Consolidated Naturalists' Society. Initially a collaboration of five local natural history field clubs, additional clubs and societies from across Yorkshire continued to join. The association renamed itself the Yorkshire Naturalists' Union in 1876.

Activities
The Yorkshire Naturalists' Union organises joint field trips, co-operates with the British Association for the Advancement of Science and other county-sized associations, and publishes a journal, The Naturalist. The journal was first published by the Yorkshire Naturalists' Union in August 1878.

Notable members

William Sawney Bisat(1886–1973), geologist
Frederick Orpen Bower (1855–1948), botanist
 William Norwood Cheesman (1847–1925), mycologist
Alfred Clarke (1848–1925), mycologist and photographer
William Eagle Clarke (1853–1938), ornithologist
Charles Crossland (1844–1916), mycologist and ecologist
James William Davis (1846–1893), geologist
John Farrah (1849–1907), botanist and meteorologist
Percy H. Grimshaw (1869–1939), entomologist and zoogeographer
Henry Bendelack Hewetson (1850–1899), ornithologist
William Walsham How (1823–1897), botanist and Bishop of Wakefield
George Edward Massee (1845–1917), mycologist
Seth Lister Mosley (1847–1829), ornithologist and museum curator
James Needham (1849–1913), mycologist and ecologist
Arthur Anselm Pearson (1874–1954), mycologist
George Taylor Porritt (1848–1927), entomologist
Albert Seward (1863–1941), botanist and geologist. Professor of Botany, Cambridge University from 1906 to 1936
Henry Thomas Soppitt (1858–1899), mycologist
James Varley (1817–1883), ornithologist and entomologist
Harold Wager (1862–1929), mycologist
Roy Watling (b. 1938), mycologist
Thomas William Woodhead (1863–1940), plant ecologist

See also

Members of the Yorkshire Naturalists' Union

References

External links

 Official webpage of the Yorkshire Naturalists' Union

Biology societies
Natural history societies
1861 establishments in England
Organisations based in Yorkshire